Agriculture in Singapore is a small industry, composing about 0.5% of the total GDP, within the city-state of Singapore.

History

Agriculture in Singapore became heavily reduced as early as 1987.

Before modernised development, Orchard Road was a stretch of agricultural orchards. As with many other areas, the farms there soon began to disappear, and Singapore became more reliant on overseas imports. One major issue in 1984 was the health concerns with pig farms in Singapore, concerning the pollution of the environment.

Major agricultural products

Food crops

Fruits produced in Singapore include durians, rambutans, and mangosteens, while edible fungus produced in the country include mushrooms. There are also farms in the country responsible for the production of eggs, vegetables, poultry, and pork.

Flower crops
Flowers grown in Singapore are exported to other parts of the world, namely Japan, the United States, Australia, and territories in Western Europe. Such flowers include the orchid. There are 153 orchid farms in Singapore. Plants are mostly cultivated in Singapore for decorative purposes.

Fishing
Fish grown in Singapore are mostly kept as aquarium fish, though some fish farms rear fish as food items. Qian Hu Corporation Limited is a major fishery in Singapore, farming, exporting, and importing some thousand fish species. On 5 June 2020, the Singapore Food Agency announced that domestic Singapore consumers will eventually be able to buy wholesale seafood at a single location at some time in the coming years, with Jurong Fishery Port and Senoko Fishery Port being consolidated by 2023.

Statistics
Singapore produces around 22,458 tonnes of vegetables while its population consumes 524,462 tonnes of them in 2016. Farming takes place mostly in the countryside region of Singapore, where the farms are located. About 113.9 hectares of land are allocated for vegetable farming as of 2014. Agriculture in the country is responsible for less than 0.5 percent of the country gross domestic product (GDP), as of 2010.

Food security
The agricultural production in Singapore is not enough to deliver to the needs of the country's people, and as such, about 90 percent of the country's food comes from overseas imports, making food security an important issue.
In March 2019, the government of Singapore set the "30 by 30" goal which aims to become 30% self-sufficient in food production by the year 2030. It aims to do this through high-tech vegetable farms (i.e. multi-storey hydroponics farms), and through aquaculture farms. By using multi-storey hydroponics farms, land productivity can be increased and energy and water resource use can be maximised.

The COVID-19 pandemic highlighted the vulnerabilities to Singapore's food supply. Mr Ang Wei Neng (Jurong GRC) suggested on 6 April that the country should encourage urban farming.

Governance
The Agri-Food & Veterinary Authority (AVA) was the authoritative body in charge of the oversight of agriculture in Singapore. Agricultural imports are habitually reviewed for safety and health, especially during crises such as bird flu outbreaks in other parts of the world. The AVA was absorbed into the Singapore Food Agency (SFA). Genetically modified organisms and synthetic biology products both fall under the GMO regulations on biosafety, and the Biological Agents and Toxins Act. For further review see Schiemann et al 2017.

See also
 Biotechnology
 Economy of Singapore
 List of countries with organic agriculture regulation
 Organic farming by country

References